In chess, a king walk, also known as a king march, steel king (literally "wanderking") or fighting king, is a maneuver where the king travels up the board in the middle game or opening, often involved in a  against the opposing king. This is a highly unusual occurrence, since the safety of the king is considered paramount, and players are recommended to keep the king out of harm's way, at least until the endgame. In contrast, Wilhelm Steinitz, often known as the father of modern chess, was renowned for his maxim that "the king is a fighting piece". Dutch chess historian and author Tim Krabbé has documented over one hundred such games.

Because of the rarity of such tactics, those that reap rewards for the attacking player often have  bestowed upon them. Perhaps the most famous in recent history, where Nigel Short defeated Jan Timman in Tilburg in 1991, was voted as one of the hundred greatest chess games in a list compiled by master Graham Burgess, and grandmasters John Nunn and John Emms.

Example games
 Short vs. Timman, Tilburg 1991. Alekhine Defense: Modern, Alburt Variation (B04), . Short ties up Timman's pieces and his king can advance.
 Alekhine vs. Yates, London 1922. Queen's Gambit Declined: Orthodox Defense, Main Line (D64), . Alekhine conjures up an attack in the endgame, and his king joins the fray.

See also
 Chess tactics

References

External links
 "His Majesty steps out" capanegra, Chessgames.com

Chess terminology